Saint Paul College is a public community college in Saint Paul, Minnesota. It is part of the Minnesota State Colleges and Universities System. The college enrolls nearly 15,000 students in the Minneapolis-Saint Paul metropolitan area; the average student age is 26. It also employs 121 full-time faculty, 168 part-time faculty, 192 staff members, and 16 administrative members.

History
Saint Paul College was founded in 1910 as a boy’s vocational high school. In 1966, the college moved into its current facility and became Saint Paul Technical Vocational Institute, or Saint Paul TVI. In 2002, the college added liberal arts to its curriculum and changed its name to Saint Paul College – A Community & Technical College.

Saint Paul College was home to the countries oldest watchmaking and clockmaking programs. In its last few years, it was awarded a grant from Rolex and started offering the WOSTEP certificate, an industry wide accepted certification for watchmaking excellence.

In the spring of 2019, the college briefly gained national attention when a site visit team of the college's regional accreditor, the Higher Learning Commission, documented several reports from college faculty members alleging that the college president's leadership style was "grounded in fear and intimidation." Shortly thereafter, President Rassoul Dastmozd announced that he would resign on June 30.

Campus
Saint Paul College is located in the Cathedral Hill neighborhood near downtown St. Paul. Its current campus is 520,968 square feet with one building. The college opened a new building in 2017 called the Saint Paul College Health and Science Alliance Center which serves as the primary space for the College’s STEM and health career programs.

References

External links

1910 establishments in Minnesota
Community colleges in Minnesota
Educational institutions established in 1910
Universities and colleges in Saint Paul, Minnesota